The Bank of Kaohsiung (BOK) is a public bank headquartered in Zuoying District, Kaohsiung, Taiwan.

History
The bank was established on 13 January 1982.

Organizational structures
 Credit Management Department
 Risk Management Department
 Business Management Department
 Treasury Department
 Legal Affairs Department
 Executive Administration Department
 Human Resources Department
 IT Department
 Municipal Treasury Department
 Financial Market Department
 Offshore Banking Unit
 International Banking Department
 Trust Department
 Wealth Management Department

See also
List of banks in Taiwan
List of companies of Taiwan

References

Banks of Taiwan
Companies listed on the Taiwan Stock Exchange
Banks established in 1982
Taiwanese companies established in 1982